Ərəbbəsra is a village and municipality in the Yevlakh Rayon of Azerbaijan.  It has a population of 806.

External links 

Populated places in Yevlakh District